Hernandes Felippe Ximenes (born March 11, 1976 in Rio de Janeiro, Brazil) is a Brazilian footballer currently playing for Mesquita Futebol Clube in Brazil Third Division.

References 

1976 births
Living people
Brazilian footballers
Expatriate footballers in El Salvador
C.D. FAS footballers
São Paulo FC players
Fluminense FC players
Albacete Balompié players
SSV Jahn Regensburg players
Expatriate footballers in Germany
Association football forwards
Footballers from Rio de Janeiro (city)